Adriano Passuello (born 3 November 1942) is a retired Italian professional road cyclist. He rode the Tour de France in 1968 and 1976 and Giro d'Italia in 1968–1974. He won the Giro della Valle d'Aosta in 1964 and the Tour of Tessin in 1967.

References 

1942 births
Living people
Italian male cyclists
Cyclists from the Province of Vicenza